Suomenmaa is a Finnish language party newspaper published four days a week from Tuesday to Friday in Oulu, Finland.

History and profile
The newspaper was established in 1908 as Maakansa in Viipuri to support the Agrarian League. Later the editors moved from Viipuri to Helsinki. Then the headquarters of the paper moved to Oulu. When the Agrarian League changed its name to Center Party in 1965 during Johannes Virolainen's chairmanship Maakansa also changed its name. Therefore, the paper is the organ of the Centre Party. Apart from Suomenmaa, the publisher Joutsen Media owns Oulu, Koillissanomat (1986-), Iijokiseutu, Rantalakeus (1976-) as well as Kolmiokirjan (1981-), Regina magazine and many cross word magazines.

Suomenmaa has both local and national editions. Its local edition was published five times a week in the Northern Bothnia until the end of 2009. Its national edition is published three times a week. According to official figures paper's circulation was 10 077 copies. In January 2010 a new monthly delivered to the subscribers Sentteri was published first time. Its circulation was 60 000 copies.

The editor-in-chief is Juha Määttä. In 1997  the local edition of Suomenmaan had a circulation of 5,100 copies. The circulation of its national edition was 11,200 copies the same year.

Chief editors
Juha Määttä 2011
Pekka Perttula 2010
Pirkko Wilen 2010, acting
Timo Laaninen
Juho Mauno 1999-2008
Samuli Pohjamo
Otto Karhi 1908-?

References

External links
Suomenmaa

Centre Party (Finland)
1908 establishments in Finland
Finnish-language newspapers
Newspapers published in Helsinki
Mass media in Oulu
Daily newspapers published in Finland
Newspapers established in 1908